Adidas Championship Football is a soccer video game developed by Ocean Software in 1990. It was released for the Commodore 64, Amstrad CPC and ZX Spectrum. The Spectrum version of the game went to #2 in the UK sales charts, behind Shadow Warriors.

References

External links
 Game at GameSpot

Association football video games
Amstrad CPC games
Commodore 64 games
ZX Spectrum games
1990 video games
Ocean Software games
Video games developed in the United Kingdom